Ashkelon Coal Jetty Breakwater Light  is a lighthouse in Ashkelon, Israel. It is located at the end of the main breakwater of the Ashkelon Port Coal Jetty, in the Ashkelon Oil Port operated by the Eilat Ashkelon Pipeline Company, near the Trans-Israel pipeline.

The site is closed to the public.

See also

 List of lighthouses in Israel

References

 Listed as "Ashkelon (Ashqelon) Outer Breakwater".

Lighthouses in Israel
Buildings and structures in Ashkelon